Emir Can İğrek (born 2 April 1993, Çerkezköy) is a Turkish singer and songwriter. He started making music by setting up small stage groups in the city where he was born. In 2019, he had his breakthrough with the song "Nalan". At the 2020 PowerTürk Music Awards, he was awarded as the "Most Powerful Newcomer of the Year". He has also composed songs for artists such as Funda Arar and Ferhat Göçer.

As of 2020, he is studying at Yıldız Technical University.

Discography 
Albums
 Ağır Roman (2018)

EP
 "Sapa" (2020)

Singles
 "Gönül Davası" (2017)
 "Aç Bağrını" (2018)
 "Defoluyorum" (2019)
 "Gömleğimin Cebi" (2019)
 "Dönsen Bile" (2019)
 "Nevale" (2019)
 "Nalan" (2019)
 "Silahım Yok" (2019)
 "Meydan" (2020)
 "Darbe" (ft. Patron) (2020)
 "Saman Sarısı" (2020)
 "Dargın" (with Zeynep Bastık) (2020)
 "Bıraktım Şaşırmayı" (2021)
 "Zemin" (2021)
 "Memur" (2021)
 "Çiftetelli" (2021)
 "Kor" (2021)
 "İntihaşk" (2021)
 "Gurbete Kaçacağım" (Yeni Türkü Zamansız) (2022)
 "Felfena" (2022)
 "Bana Unutmayı Anlat" (with Cem Adrian (2022)
 "Kafa Tatili" (2022)
 "Facia" (2022)
 "Görünce Dünyamın Yıkıldığı (Live)" (with Şanışer, 2022)
 "Beyoğlu" (2022)
 "Dayanamam" (2022)

Awards 
 Most Powerful Newcomer Singer in 2019, PowerTürk Music Awards
 Most Admired Male Singer in 2019, Altınyıldız Classics Stars of the Year Awards (YTU)

References 

1993 births
Turkish male singers
Turkish composers
Yıldız Technical University alumni
Living people
Turkish lyricists
People from Tekirdağ Province